Alfred Waterhouse (1830–1905) was a prolific English architect who worked in the second half of the 19th century. His buildings were largely in Victorian Gothic Revival style. Waterhouse's biographer, Colin Cunningham, states that between about 1865 and about 1885 he was "the most widely employed British architect". He worked in many fields, designing commercial, public, educational, domestic, and ecclesiastical buildings.

Waterhouse was born in Liverpool of Quaker parents. After being articled to Richard Lane in Manchester, he took a ten-month tour of the Continent, then established his own practice in Manchester. Many of his early commissions came from Quakers and other nonconformist patrons. He came to national recognition when he won a competition for the design of Manchester assize courts. His next major public commissions in Manchester were for Strangeways Gaol and Manchester Town Hall. In 1865 he opened an office in London, which was followed by his first major commission in London, the Natural History Museum. Meanwhile he was also designing country houses. Here his major work was the rebuilding of Eaton Hall in Cheshire for the 1st Duke of Westminster, which was "the most expensive country house of the [19th] century". He also designed educational buildings including schools and works for the universities of Cambridge, Oxford, Manchester, and Liverpool. In the commercial field, he designed banks, and offices for insurance and assurance companies, especially the Prudential Assurance Company, for whom he built 27 buildings.

Waterhouse's success came from "a thoroughly professional approach rather than on brilliance or innovation as a stylist". He paid particular attention to detail and, although he designed many major buildings, he still accepted smaller commissions. Although most of his work was in the Gothic Revival style, he also employed other styles, including Romanesque and French Renaissance. He used many building materials, but is noted for his use of red brick and terracotta. The use of these materials for many university buildings in the north of England is a major factor in their being termed "red brick universities". In addition to his design work as an architect, Waterhouse was an assessor for about 60 architectural competitions. He was awarded the Royal Gold Medal of the Royal Institute of British Architects in 1878 for his design for Manchester Town Hall, and was president of that institution from 1888 to 1891. He was gained international diplomas, and in 1895 was awarded an honorary LL.D by Manchester University. Waterhouse was also a painter, exhibiting 80 watercolours at the Royal Academy. He suffered a stroke in 1901, and died in his home at Yattendon, Berkshire, in 1905. His practice was continued by his son Paul, followed by his grandson, Michael, and his great-grandson. His estate at death amounted to over £215,000 (equivalent to £ as of ).

Throughout his career, Waterhouse designed houses ranging in size from the largest in the country to small cottages. They included country houses, rectories and vicarages, and associated structures such as lodges, stables, gatehouses, and accommodation for estate workers. This list includes the major structures in this category, most of which are listed buildings.

Key

Buildings

See also
List of ecclesiastical works by Alfred Waterhouse
List of educational buildings by Alfred Waterhouse
List of commercial buildings by Alfred Waterhouse
List of public and civic buildings by Alfred Waterhouse

References

Bibliography

Lists of buildings and structures by architect
Lists of buildings and structures in England
Lists of buildings and structures in Scotland